Pindari Kanda Traill's Pass (el. ) is a mountain pass through the Himalayas located between Nanda Devi and Nanda Kot peaks in the Uttarakhand state in the districts of Pithoragarh and Bageshwar in India.

It is situated at the end of Pindari glacier and links Pindari valley to Milam valley (Lawan Gad) and is said to be very difficult to cross. The pass was reached in 1830 by G.W. Traill, the first British Deputy Commissioner of Kumaon division. In 1926, it was crossed by Hugh Ruttledge.

People from Johar Valley and Pindar Valley attempted to cross it for trade. Budha Malak Singh of Supi village of Bageshwar District of Uttarakhand State was the first man to cross it 1830 after 100 years. Later Mr. Trail also attempted to cross the pass but failed, though the pass was since then named as Trail's Pass, earlier it was called "Pindari Kanda". Trail's Pass (el. 5,312 m) is a mountain pass through the Himalayas located between the unnamed southern shoulder of Mt. Nanda Devi East and Changuch (Western shoulder of Mt. Nanda Kot) peaks in Uttarakhand state in the districts of Bageshwar and Pithoragarh. It is situated at the head of Pindari glacier and Trails pass bridges Pindari Valley with LwanValley (Nandadevi East Base camp) and is said to be very difficult to cross. Though Pindari glacier is visited by many people every year, yet Trail's Pass, which is at its top remains an elusive goal.

By Himalayan standards, the Pindari glacier and the Trail's Pass do not match most of the giants. The Pindari is neither the largest nor the longest of the glaciers nor is the Trail's Pass, at its head, the highest of passes. However, Pindari has been the most frequently visited Himalayan glacier since the mid-19th century when a bridle-path with dak bungalows at suitable intervals between there and Almora was built. Even today, it is so popular a trekking destination that a tenfold increase in the number of beds available is unable to cope with the influx.

What faces a visitor to Pindari glacier at the Zero Point, along its left lateral moraine, is an immense wall of jagged, broken ice criss-crossed with thousands of seracs and crevasses. The upper icefields of the glacier are invisible from there and the near level ice mass at its lower end at the snout below recedes into insignificance. What people call the Pindari glacier is actually a huge icefall passing over a steep slope, through which a direct ascent has yet to be made. Above this lie the icefields of the surrounding heights and the névé basin of the glacier, some 8 km long, separated from the ridge above with a text-book fashion bergschrund. The lowest point on the ridge at 5312 m is the Trail's Pass. Beyond the pass to the north and east lies the Lwan valley whose catchment is the Gori ganga valley.

Pindar river which forms the main tributary of river Alaknanda which further joins the Bhagirathi to form The Ganges at Dev Prayag.

Since 1830, Trail's pass has been attempted by more than 90 teams, until now only 20 teams are known to have attained success. Most recently Traill's Pass was crossed by a group from Uttarakhand in October 2021

Teams are listed below:

SNO.	YEAR	TEAM

1	1830	Malak Singh, Supi, Bageshwar.

2	1855	Adolf Schlagintweit

3	1861	Captain Ed Smyth

4	1899	Kurt Buch

5	1926	Hughe Ruttledge with wife

6	1930	Hughe Stenlorge

7	1931	Devan Singh Martolia

8	1936 August Gansser

9	1941	S.S. khera

10	1994	Nainital Mountaineering Club Nanital.

11	2009	Martin Moran, England June

12 2009 Basanta Singha Roy along with 3 members and 4 Sherpas of Mountaineers' Association of Krishnanagar crossed Trail's Pass on 30 August 2009 http://www.mak.org.in

13	2009    Bhadreswar Pathfinder Adventurers (in Sept.)

14	2013	Himalpinist  -Dhruv Joshi, Bharat Bhushan & Vineet kumar Saini (MAY-JUNE) first smallest team so far http://www.himalpinist.com

15	2015	Dhruv Joshi, Ulrich - Karen Rauner (SEPT-OCT)

16   2016   HITAM (Himalaya trekkers and mountaineer) largest group until date (12-members, 11- porters) (sept-oct)

17   2017 Major Chirag Chatterjee and team, Indian Army. (6 members) (SEPT)

18 2017 Himalpinist-Dhruv Joshi, Narendra Kumar, Ravi Bangera, Prashant Sawant, Aberrant Wanderers - Sanket Patil (youngest until date) (Sept-Oct) second smallest team 

19 2019-September:  Tanmoy Dam, Bidyut Das, Ashis Das,  Siddheswar Khearu, Sankar Sarkar, Rahul Guha, Sayantan Dutta and Monojit Basu, we are 8 members successfully cross the pass without any health issues.
Dawa and Tengin  Sherpa support us. Rupsingh  Ji and Mohon guide us of trail's pass trek.
Note- "jumaring and rappel down is very hard for rock fall of trail's pass.rope(700-800 meter) and rock piton is More needed. September mid is preferable time for trail's pass. It's a challenging trek. - Tanmoy Dam"

20 2021 October by team from Uttarakhand. Team members were Araib Hasan ( Bageshwar), Nitin Bhardwaj ( Haridwar), Dinesh Chandra Singh ( guide, Jatoli), Dev Singh, Pratap Singh ( HAP from Wacham), Indra Singh, Pravin Singh ( Hap from Jhuni)

21. 2022 June : The team consisted of Jibin Joseph (Kerela), Sumanta Bose (West Bengal), Runa Dey (West Bengal) and Raju Chakraborty (West Bengal). Support staff were Balwant Singh (Sr. Guide), Mohan Singh (Guide), Tara Singh (HAP), Dev Singh (HAP), Pratap Singh (HAP) and Govind Singh (HAP) all from Jatoli and adjacent Villages, Uttarakhand. All members successfully crossed the pass from Pindari Valley (Pindari ABC) to Milam Valley side (Nanda Devi-East ABC) on 14 June 2022. The expedition was approved by Indian Mountaineering Foundation and team leader was Raju Chakraborty.

Note: Runa Dey - The first woman from West Bengal and second from India to cross the pass. 
Jibin Joseph - The first man from Kerela to cross the pass.

Footnotes

Mountain passes of Uttarakhand
Mountain passes of the Himalayas
Geography of Pithoragarh district
Bageshwar district